Ee Manoharatheeram is a 1978 Indian Malayalam film, directed by I. V. Sasi. The film stars Madhu, Jayan, Jayabharathi and Vidhubhala  in the lead roles. The film has musical score by G. Devarajan.

Cast
 
Madhu as Ravi
Sukumaran as Vishnu
K. P. Ummer  as Ravi
Jayan  as Ajayan
Jayabharathi as Ganga
Vidhubala as Geetha
Rajakokila  as Daniya
Ravikumar as Babu
Shobhana as Anitha
Seema as Cabret dancer
KPAC Lalitha 
Hariharan 
Kuthiravattam Pappu 
Philomina

Soundtrack
The music was composed by G. Devarajan and the lyrics were written by Bichu Thirumala.

References

External links
  
 

1978 films
1970s Malayalam-language films
Films directed by I. V. Sasi